Jorge Luis Pacheco Polanco (born July 5, 1993) is a Dominican professional baseball infielder for the Minnesota Twins of Major League Baseball (MLB).

Career
Polanco signed with the Minnesota Twins as an international free agent in 2009. He made his debut in 2010 for the Dominican Summer League Twins. He also played for the Gulf Coast Twins that year and hit .233./303/.294 overall. He remained with the Gulf Coast Twins in 2011, hitting .250/.319/.349 in 51 games. Playing for the Elizabethton Twins in 2012, he hit .318/.388/.514 with five home runs in 51 games. He played the 2013 season for the Cedar Rapids Kernels hitting .308/.362/.452 and five home runs in 115 games. After the season, he played for the Leones del Escogido of the Dominican Professional Baseball League. In November he was added to the Twins 40-man roster. Polanco started the 2014 season with the Fort Myers Miracle.

Polanco was called up to the majors for the first time on June 26, 2014. Polanco totaled a combined 9 games between 2014 and the 2015 season with the Twins. He got his first extensive look in the majors in 2016, when he played in 69 games. He hit .282 with 4 home runs and 27 runs batted in. The following season, Polanco was the primary shortstop for the whole season for the Twins, hitting .256 with 13 home runs and 74 RBIs in 133 games.

On March 18, 2018, Polanco was suspended for 80 games after testing positive for Stanozolol, a performance-enhancing drug and was also ineligible for postseason play. He was reinserted as the Twins shortstop upon his return from suspension. In 77 games, he hit .288 with 6 home runs and 42 RBIs.

On April 5, 2019, Polanco hit for the cycle against the Philadelphia Phillies, going 5-for-5 with one RBI in a 10–4 loss.

Polanco was the American League starting shortstop in the 2019 Major League Baseball All-Star Game. On the season, Polanco finished with a .295 batting average in 153 games. He hit 22 home runs, drove in 79 RBI and scored 107 runs. In 2020, Polanco hit .258 with 4 home runs and 19 RBI in 55 games.

In 2021, Polanco batted .269/.323/.503 and set career highs with 33 home runs and 98 RBIs.

Personal life
Polanco is married to Lucero Polanco. They have three children together.

See also
List of Major League Baseball players suspended for performance-enhancing drugs

References

External links

1993 births
Living people
American League All-Stars
Cedar Rapids Kernels players
Dominican Republic expatriate baseball players in the United States
Dominican Republic sportspeople in doping cases
Dominican Summer League Twins players
Elizabethton Twins players
Fort Myers Miracle players
Gulf Coast Twins players
Leones del Escogido players
Major League Baseball players from the Dominican Republic
Major League Baseball players suspended for drug offenses
Minnesota Twins players
New Britain Rock Cats players
Sportspeople from San Pedro de Macorís